Dark Horses is the third album by Australian alternative rock band The Getaway Plan, released on 3 July 2015.

Background 
On 1 November 2014, The Getaway Plan announced plans to release their third full-length record, Dark Horses. The band chose to set up a crowd-funding campaign through PledgeMusic so that they could remain independent and release the album without a record label.

Dark Horses is the first album by The Getaway Plan to be fully written and recorded in Australia. They worked alongside long-time friend and producer Sam K creating the record between November 2014 and March 2015. Dark Horses was recorded at both The Studios in the City in Brunswick and at Sing Sing Studios in Cremorne.

Dark Horses was released on 3 July 2015. The album debuted at #10 on the ARIA Albums Chart, marking the band's highest charting position ever in Australia with their debut LP Other Voices, Other Rooms peaking at #14 and their sophomore record Requiem reaching #17.

Track listing 
All lyrics written by Matthew Wright, all songs written by The Getaway Plan.

Personnel 
 Matthew Wright – vocals, piano, guitar
 Clint Owen Ellis – guitar
 Mike Maio – bass guitar
 Dan Maio – drums, percussion
Additional personnel

 Samuel K Sproull – producer, engineer, mixer, mastering.
 Jon Grace – assistant engineer

 Chris Carmichael – strings on tracks 2, 8, 9.
 Freeds – vocals on track 7

Charts

References 

2011 albums
The Getaway Plan albums